Ranchaero Airport  is a private-use airport a mile west of Chico, in Butte County, California.

Until 2009 it was a public-use airport with the FAA identifier O23.

Facilities
Ranchaero Airport covers 23 acres (9 ha) at an elevation of 173 feet (53 m). Its runway, 14/32, is 2,156 by 30 feet (657 x 9 m).

In 2004 the airport had 5,000 general aviation aircraft operations, average 13 per day. 34 aircraft were then based at this airport: 88% single-engine and 12% helicopter.

References

External links 
 Aerial image as of August 1998 from USGS The National Map

Airports in Butte County, California
Buildings and structures in Chico, California